May–Kraus Farm, also known as La Paix Herb Farm, is a historic home located near Alum Bridge, Lewis County, West Virginia.  The original farmhouse was built about 1850, and is a two-story log house appended as an ell to the rear of the main house.  The main house is a two-story, wood-frame I house.  It features a two-story porch.  Also on the property is a root cellar (1880) and chicken / pig shed (1880).

It was listed on the National Register of Historic Places in 2006.

References

External links
La Paix Herb Farm website

Farms on the National Register of Historic Places in West Virginia
Houses completed in 1850
Houses in Lewis County, West Virginia
Houses on the National Register of Historic Places in West Virginia
I-houses in West Virginia
National Register of Historic Places in Lewis County, West Virginia
Log buildings and structures on the National Register of Historic Places in West Virginia